The Eagle and Child, nicknamed The Bird and Baby, is a pub in St Giles' Street, Oxford, England, owned by St. John's College, Oxford and operated by Mitchells & Butlers as a Nicholson's pub. The pub had been part of an endowment belonging to University College since the 17th century. It has associations with the Inklings writers' group which included J. R. R. Tolkien and C. S. Lewis. In 2005, 25 other pubs had the same name.

History

A small, narrow building, the pub reputedly served as the lodgings of the Chancellor of the Exchequer during the English Civil War (1642–49), when Oxford was the Royalist capital.  The landmark served as a pay house for the Royalist army, and pony auctions were held in the rear courtyard. These claims are inconsistent with the earliest date usually given for construction of the pub, 1650, and the fact that the pub lies outside the city walls may also give some cause for doubt.

The first record of the pub's name is from 1684, and is variously said to derive from the legend of Ganymede being abducted by the eagle of Zeus, or from the crest of the Earl of Derby, with a story of a noble-born baby found in an eagle's nest. The child was called Oskatel and was found by Sir Thomas Lathom, who became father-in-law to Sir John Stanley. The pub's long-standing nickname is the Bird and Baby.

The pub had been part of an endowment belonging to University College since the 17th century. The college placed it on the market for £1.2 million in December 2003, saying that it needed to rebalance its property portfolio. It was bought by the nearby St John's College, which also owns the Lamb and Flag pub opposite. The Eagle and Child is a Grade II listed building.

The pub has remained closed since March 2020 in the early part of the COVID-19 pandemic. Planning permission has been granted to sympathetically refurbish it, with the upper floors being converted to hotel accommodation, along with the upper floors of two adjacent properties, the ground floor of the adjacent property serving as the hotel reception and the addition of a restaurant to the rear of the property. The planned changes will not affect the appearance of front of the pub, including the Rabbit Room. The business is expected to be closed at least until 2023.

Literary connections

The Inklings were an Oxford writers' group which included C. S. Lewis, J. R. R. Tolkien, Charles Williams, Owen Barfield, and Hugo Dyson. From late 1933, they met on Thursday evenings at Lewis's college rooms at Magdalen, where they would read and discuss various material, including their unfinished manuscripts. These meetings were accompanied with more informal lunchtime gatherings at various Oxford pubs, and coalesced into a regular meeting held on Monday or Tuesday lunchtimes at The Eagle and Child, in a private lounge at the back of the pub called the 'Rabbit Room'.

The formal Thursday meetings ended in October 1949 when interest in the readings petered out, but the meetings at the Eagle and Child continued, and it was at one of those meetings in June 1950 that C.S. Lewis distributed the proofs for The Lion, the Witch and the Wardrobe.

The membership of the Inklings changed over the years. Tolkien, for example, drifted away from the meetings in the late 1950s, whereas Lewis, who had lived around Oxford since 1921, was a central figure until his death in 1963. When The Eagle and Child was modernised in 1962, with the pub being extended to the rear, the Rabbit Room's former privacy was inevitably destroyed; the group reluctantly changed its allegiance to the Lamb & Flag on the other side of St Giles. The meetings in the Lamb & Flag were soon abandoned after Lewis's death.

In popular culture

The Eagle and Child featured in Colin Dexter's novel The Secret of Annexe 3, in which Inspector Morse and Sergeant Lewis read the wooden plaque to the Inklings in the pub's back bar. It was also used as a location in the television series Inspector Morse in the 1991 episode "Second Time Around", in which it was dressed up as "Shears Wine Bar".

Notes

References

External links

 Eagle and Child pub website
 Oxford History: Eagle and Child
 Tolkien's Oxford: The Bird and Baby
 The C. S. Lewis Foundation website
 Eagle and Child Pub: Oxford, England
 The Eagle and Child Pub

Pubs in Oxford
Culture in Oxford
 Eagle and Child
St John's College, Oxford
University College, Oxford
Grade II listed buildings in Oxford
Grade II listed pubs in Oxfordshire
Timber framed buildings in England